A special election was held in  on May 23, 1797, to fill a vacancy left by Daniel Buck (F) declining to serve the term to which he'd been re-elected in the previous election.

Election results

See also
List of special elections to the United States House of Representatives

References

Vermont 02
Vermont 1797 02
1797 02 Special
Vermont 02 Special
United States House of Representatives 02
United States House of Representatives 1797 02